Weston "Seth" Kelsey (born August 24, 1981 in Santa Monica, California) is an American épée fencer and three time Olympic fencer. He competed at three Olympiads: 2004, 2008 and 2012. He finished 4th in the individual competition at the 2012 London Olympics.

Career 

He finished 17th in the individual competition at the 2008 Beijing Olympics. He has competed at the World Fencing Championships since 2003. His best results were seventh at the 2010 World Fencing Championships in Paris, France.  He was a member of the American team that won the silver medal in team épée at the 2010 World Championships and a member of the American épée team that won the 2012 World Championships in Kiev, Ukraine.  He competed in the 2012 Olympics at London, losing his semi-final 5 - 6 to eventual champion Ruben Limardo.  He went on to compete against Korean épée fencer Jung Jin-Sun in the bronze medal match, losing 11 - 12 in the sudden death priority minute.

References

External links 

 Seth Kelsey athlete page at USA Fencing
 Seth Kelsey FIE license page at Federation Internationale D'Escrime

1981 births
American male épée fencers
Living people
Olympic fencers of the United States
Fencers at the 2004 Summer Olympics
Fencers at the 2007 Pan American Games
Fencers at the 2008 Summer Olympics
Fencers at the 2011 Pan American Games
Fencers at the 2012 Summer Olympics
Sportspeople from Santa Monica, California
Pan American Games gold medalists for the United States
Pan American Games bronze medalists for the United States
Pan American Games medalists in fencing
United States Air Force Athlete of the Year
Medalists at the 2011 Pan American Games